This is a list of mayors of the Municipality of Choluteca, Honduras that are elected by democratic elections:

Choluteca Department
Lists of mayors